Semeria may refer to:

 Semeria River (or Benedec River), a tributary of the Olt River in Romania
 Giovanni Semeria (1867–1931), Italian orator-preacher and author